Heilbad Heiligenstadt station is a railway station in the municipality of Heilbad Heiligenstadt, located in the Eichsfeld district in Thuringia, Germany.

References

Railway stations in Thuringia
Buildings and structures in Eichsfeld (district)